Sant'Agostino is a gothic-style, Roman Catholic church located in Cremona, region of Lombardy, Italy.

History

The church we see incorporated a prior church of San Giacomo in Braida, and was erected between 1339 and 1345. Further refurbishments of the interior occurred in 1553 and again in 1664. Once attached to an eremitic monastery of Augustinian monks, the church acquired extensive decoration, including:
Bianca Maria Visconti and Francesco Sforza, Cappella Cavalcabò or third chapel on right, by Bonifacio Bembo (detached fresco originally from the ducal chapel)
Enthroned Madonna and Child between Saints John Evangelist and Augustine (1490), altarpiece by Pietro Perugino 
Cappella della Passione di Cristo, 2nd chapel on right, statuary group depicting the Passion of Christ (1666) by  Giovanni Battista Barberini
Main altarpiece depicting The Redeemer gives his blood to the Doctors of the Church (1594) by Andrea Mainardi.

References

Roman Catholic churches in Cremona
14th-century Roman Catholic church buildings in Italy
Gothic architecture in Lombardy
Churches completed in 1345